Lovellona peaseana is a species of sea snail, a marine gastropod mollusk in the family Mitromorphidae.

Description
The length of the shell varies between 6.5 mm and 8 mm.

Distribution
This marine species occurs off the Philippines, the Solomon Islands and Hawaii

References

 Filmer R.M. (2001). A Catalogue of Nomenclature and Taxonomy in the Living Conidae 1758–1998. Backhuys Publishers, Leiden. 388pp.
 Tucker J.K. (2009). Recent cone species database. 4 September 2009 Edition.

External links
 
 

peaseana
Gastropods described in 1927